Charles Lovell may refer to:
Bernard Lovell (Charles Bernard Lovell, 1913–2012), English physicist
Charles C. Lovell (born 1929), United States federal judge
Charles Henry Lovell (1854–1916), farmer, lumber merchant and political figure in Quebec
Charles Lovell (trade unionist) (1923–2014), British trade union leader
Chuck Lovell (born ), chief of the Portland, Oregon Police Bureau